Sang-nu (상루, 尙婁) (died 294) was the prime minister of Goguryeo during the reign of King Seocheon, and the son of previous Prime Minister Eum-u.

Background 
Sang-nu, like his father, was from the Biryu-Bu of Goguryeo. His last name and ancestry are also unknown, but it is known that he and his father possessed a considerable amount of power over the nobles. Sang-Noo was the first Prime Minister to have inherited the position of prime minister from his father.

Life 
Very little is mentioned on this figure. This lack of mention in historical records may signify that prime minister Sang-nu was an excellent government official, or an incompetent one. This cannot be known. Sang-nu died in the year 294, during the 3rd year of the reign of King Bongsang and was succeeded by Chang Jo-ri.

See also 
 Three Kingdoms of Korea
 Goguryeo

Sources 
 Samguk Sagi, Goguryeo Bon-Gi

Goguryeo
History of Korea
3rd-century heads of government
Goguryeo people